The Kingdom of the Rugii or Rugiland was established by the Germanic Rugii in present-day Austria in the 5th century.

History

Background
The Rugii were an East Germanic tribe who probably migrated from southwest Norway to Pomerania in the 1st century. In the beginning of the 4th century, the Rugii moved southwards and settled at the upper Tisza in ancient Pannonia, in what is now modern Hungary. They were later attacked by the Huns, and they fought alongside Atilla at the Battle of the Catalunian Plains in 451. In 453, they successfully rebelled against the Huns along with other Germanic tribes at the Battle of Nedao, after which they settled in the counties of Waldviertel and Weinviertel which lie north of the Danube. Nowadays these counties are part of Lower Austria but were never part of the Roman province of Noricum.

Kingdom
By 467, the Rugii ruled a kingdom based in Lower Austria under their king Flaccitheus. After his death in 475, Flaccitheus was succeeded by his son Feletheus, who was married to the Goth Gisa. In 476, Felethus supported the Herulian and Scirian mercenaries of Odoacer, who overthrew the Roman Emperor Romulus Augustus and made himself King of Italy. After the Eastern Roman Emperor Zeno attempted to create conflict between the Rugii and Odoacer, Feletheus killed his brother Ferderuchus, who supported Odoacer. Odoacer subsequently invaded the Kingdom of the Rugii, where he utterly defeated the Rugian troops and captured Feletheus and his wife, who were executed in Ravenna in 487. Their territory was subsequently settled by the Lombards. Two years later, the Rugii joined the Ostrogothic king Theodoric the Great, who invaded Italy and defeated Odoacer in 493.

List of kings
Flaccitheus (454–475)
Feletheus (475–487)
Frideric (487–492/493), claimant

See also
 Rogaland
 Rügen

Primary sources
 Eugippius: Vita Sancti Severini
 Paul the Deacon: History of the Lombards

Secondary sources
 Pauly-Wissowa. Realencyclopädie der classischen Altertumswissenschaft (RE). Bd. 6,2. Stuttgart 1909, Sp. 2161f. 
 Friedrich Lotter: Severinus von Noricum, Legende und historische Wirklichkeit: Untersuchungen zur Phase des Übergangs von spätantiken zu mittelalterlichen Denk- und Lebensformen. Stuttgart 1976.
 Arnold Hugh Martin Jones u.a.: The Prosopography of the Later Roman Empire. Bd. 1, Cambridge 1971, 
 Walter Pohl: Die Gepiden und die gentes an der mittleren Donau nach dem Zerfall des Attilareiches. In: Herwig Wolfram, Falko Daim (Hrsg.): Die Völker an der mittleren und unteren Donau im fünften und sechsten Jahrhundert. Wien 1980, S. 239ff.

States and territories established in the 460s
States and territories disestablished in the 5th century
487 disestablishments
 
Medieval Austria
Former countries in Europe
Barbarian kingdoms
History of Lower Austria